Hockey Club Amiens Somme is a French ice hockey team based in Amiens playing in the Ligue Magnus. The team is also known as "Gothiques d'Amiens" (Amiens Gothics).

The team was founded in 1967 and plays home games at the Coliséum. They have twice been Magnus Cup champions, and have played in the top league since 1982.

Currently the club president is Patrick Letellier, and the head coach is Mario Richer.

Roster 
Updated February 1, 2019.

Awards and trophies
Ligue Magnus Champion 1999, 2004.
Charles Ramsay TrophyJuha Jokiharju in 200, François Rozenthal in 2004, Danick Bouchard in 2014
Albert Hassler Trophy Pierre Pousse in 1993, Maurice Rozenthal in 1999, Laurent Gras in 2003, Kevin Hecquefeuille in 2011
Jean Ferrand Trophy Frédéric Mallétroit in 1985 and 1986, Antoine Mindjimba in 1995, Billy Thompson in 2011
Jean-Pierre Graff Trophy François Dusseau in 1987, Laurent Gras in 1997, Kevin Hecquefeuille in 2003, Henri-Corentin Buysse in 2008, Fabien Kazarine in 2015
Camil Gélinas Trophy Antoine Richer in 2004
Marcel Claret Trophy Winners in 1991, 1996, 1997, 2000, and 2002
Raymond Dewas Trophy Vladimir Loubkine in 1989, Patrick Foliot in 1990 and 1991

Notable coaches
 Jean Bégin

Notable players
 Mathieu Brisebois
 Michel Galarneau
 Landry Macrez
 François Rozenthal
 Maurice Rozenthal

Retired numbers
3  Keith Vella
 10 Dave Henderson
 22 Anthony Mortas
 25 Antoine Richer
 27 Michel Breistroff
 31 Antoine Mindjimba

Denis Perez also had his 64 retired, but the honor was rescinded after he sued the club over his release.

Logos

References

External links
 Official website 
 Ligue Magnus site 

Ice hockey teams in France
Amiens
Sport in Somme (department)
Ice hockey clubs established in 1967
1967 establishments in France